Warmduscher are a London-based post-punk band formed in 2014 and currently signed to Bella Union.

Background
Warmduscher are Clams Baker Jr (Craig Louis Higgins Jr), Lightnin’ Jack Everett (Jack Everett), Quicksand (Adam J Harmer), Mr. Salt Fingers Lovecraft (Ben Romans-Hopcraft), and The Witherer aka Little Whiskers (Quinn Whalley).

Formed on New Year's Eve 2014 as an impromptu band to play at a house party, the initial line-up featured Higgins on vocals and Harmer on drums alongside Saul Adamczewski and Lias Kaci Saoudi of Fat White Family on bass and guitar respectively. The group then continued as a quintet, with Everett (drums), Romans-Hopcraft (bass), and Whalley (noise/electronics) replacing Adamczewski and Saoudi. Clash (magazine) called the group "the sleaziest, most debauched, and downright addictive experiences in London's guitar underground right now".

Career

The band's first album, Khaki Tears, was released on 11 May 2015 on Trashmouth Records. Described as "the finest of filth" and "fractured rock and roll at its best" by Louder Than War, the band explain the album's title as "the time it takes for you to pluck up the courage for something" and "the ability to cry while eating your cake no matter what it's made of".

The album was followed by the single Big Wilma/Neon Tongues, produced by Dan Carey and released on The Leaf Label on 12 January 2018. Described as a "mix of in-your-face punk and sinister electronica", the single was made available on a limited edition run of 300 7" singles.

Warmduscher's second album, Whale City, was released on The Leaf Label on 1 June 2018 and has been described by the band as "a playground for the people that have stepped above and beyond their comfort zone". Too Many Blogs called the album "dangerously debauched, infested with twisted riffs and cleverly assembled by Dan Carey’s production". "Standing On The Corner', the second single from Whale City, was released on 6 April 2018 and called a "knock out blow" by Clash Magazine. This was followed by third single "1000 Whispers" on 16 May 2018. Saul Adamczewski left the band shortly after the recording of Whale City. Fellow 'Fat White Family' member Adam J Harmer then took over on guitar.

On 11 November 2019 the band released their "unhinged but...fantastically entertaining" third album Tainted Lunch, which featured guest appearances by Iggy Pop and Kool Keith. The album was recorded in just four days with producer Dan Carey and garnered widespread acclaim. BBC 6 Music placed the album at #6 in their Albums of the Year 2019 and The Line Of Best Fit awarded it 9/10 and called the album "gritty, poppy, tasty, and utter, utter filth".

Warmduscher released European Cowboy for Record Store Day 2020. The EP features three remixes by Soulwax, Savage Gary and Decius and was limited to 1000 vinyl copies.

Band name
The name "Warmduscher" is German and literally translated means "warm shower". The made-up term colloquially refers to somebody who is perceived to be a bit too soft for something specific or not hard enough for life in general, a wimp or a pansy.

Discography

Studio albums
  Khaki Tears (2015)
  Whale City  (2018)
  Tainted Lunch  (2019)
  At the Hotspot  (2022)

EPs
  European Cowboy (2020)

Singles
 "1000 Whispers" (2018)
 "Standing On The Corner" (2018)
 "Big Wilma/Neon Tongues" (2018)
 "Midnight Dipper" (2019)
 "Disco Peanuts" (2019)

References

Musical groups from London